Alan Heathcock (born March 8, 1971) is an American fiction writer. He grew up in the Chicago suburb of Hazel Crest, Illinois and attended the University of Iowa, where he graduated in 1993 with a BA in Journalism. Heathcock earned MFAs from both Bowling Green State University (1996), and Boise State University (2003). He lives in Boise, Idaho.

Heathcock's first collection of short fiction, VOLT, was published with Graywolf Press in 2011. VOLT was selected as an Editor's Pick for both The New York Times Book Review and The Oxford American; a finalist for the Barnes & Noble Discover Award, as well as hailed by many critics as one of the best books of 2011, including Publishers Weekly, the Chicago Tribune, Salon.com, and GQ. VOLT also includes the story "Peacekeeper," which first appeared in the Fall 2005 issue of the Virginia Quarterly Review, and won Heathcock a National Magazine Award in 2006.

Works
"Our Summarative History of Quixotica," Harvard Review 22, Spring 2002
"On Suffering," Kenyon Review Online, 2014
"Shelter," Gulf Coast, Winter/Spring 2014
"Zero Percent Water," Matter, September 2014

Books
 
"The Staying Freight," Reprinted from Harvard Review 31, Fall 2006
"Fort Apache," Reprinted from Zoetrobe: All-Story, Fall 2008

 40. MCD. 2022. ISBN 978-0374100230.

Awards
• Whiting Award (2012)

• Boise Weekly Best Living Idaho Writer (2012)

• Spinetinglers Magazine, Best Short Story Collection (2012)

• GLCA New Writers Award (2012)

• Bread Loaf Writers' Conference, Shane Stevens Fellowship in Fiction (2011)

• Tin House Writers' Conference, Scholar (2010)

• Bread Loaf Writers' Conference, Carol Houck Fellowship in Fiction (2009)

• National Magazine Award, Fiction (2006)

References

External links
Alanheathcock.com
Graywolfpress.org
Profile at The Whiting Foundation

1960 births
Living people
American fiction writers
University of Iowa alumni
Bowling Green State University alumni
Boise State University alumni
Boise State University faculty